Jacobsville may refer to:

Places
 Jacobsville, Evansville, a neighborhood of Evansville, Indiana, US
 Jacobsville, Maryland, US
 Jacobsville, Michigan, US

Other uses
 Jacobsville (SoC), an Intel CPU
 Jacobsville Finnish Lutheran Church, Jacobsville, Michigan, US

See also
 Jacobsville Sandstone, from North America